Miss International 1989, the 29th Miss International pageant, was held on 17 September 1989 at Kanazawa's Kagekiza. The pageant was hosted by Masumi Okada.

Results

Placements

Contestants

  - Marcela Laura Bonesi
  - Jodie Martel
  - Bettina Berghold
  - Violetta Blazejczak
  - Katerine Rivera Vaca
  - Ana Paula Ottani
  - Victoria Susannah Lace
  - Linda Marie Farrell
  - Clelia Alexandra Ablanque Moreno
  - Maria Antonieta Sáenz Vargas
  - Maria Josephine Hirse
  - Elbanira Morales de la Rosa
  - Minna Kaarina Kittilä
  - Dorothée Lambert
  - Iris Klein
  - Emmanouela Evdoridou
  - Janiece Annette Santos
  - Sherri Joan Teixeira
  - Ghislaine Niewold
  - Cynthia Zavala
  - Donna Chu Kit-Yee
  - Gudrun Eyjolfsdóttir
  - Louise Rose Kelley
  - Limor Fishel
  - Barbara Tarcci
  - Loceilia Stephenson
  - Tamae Ogura
  - Kim Hee-jung
  - Nicole Schalz
  - Erika Salum Escalante
  - Rochelle Boyle
  - Teresa Wamar
  - Heide Olsen
  - Jenia Mayela Nenzen
  - Alba Maria Cordero Rivals
  - Lilia Eloisa Marfori Andanar
  - Aneta Kręglicka
  - Helena Cristina da Silva Teixeira
  - Michele Cotto
  - Pamela Kurt Ha Chee
  - Mercedes Martín Mier
  - Isabelle Soelmann
  - Françoise Bezzola
  - Mayuree Chaiyo
  - Esra Acar
  - Deborah Lee Husti
  - Beatriz Carolina Omaña Trujillo

1989
1989 in Japan
1989 beauty pageants
Beauty pageants in Japan